Sarmatia or Sarmatian may refer to:

 Sarmatia, the land of the Sarmatians in eastern Europe, ancient Iranian peoples closely related to the Scythians
 Sarmatia Asiatica and Sarmatia Europea, geographical differentiation of the above
 Sarmatian language, an Eastern Iranian language
 Sarmatia (moth), a genus of moths in the family Erebidae
 Sarmatian (age), an age in the geologic timescale of Central Europe and Central Asia 
 Polish–Lithuanian Commonwealth
 Sarmatism, the lifestyle of the aristocracy of the Polish–Lithuanian Commonwealth
 Sarmatism (pseudohistory), claims of Lithuanian descent from eastern Europe
 Sarmatian Review, a peer reviewed academic journal
 Sarmatian Craton, in geology the southern segment/region of the East European Craton

See also
Sarmat (disambiguation)